Kateryna Bondarenko was the defending champion, but was no longer eligible to compete in the juniors this year.

Agnieszka Radwańska defeated Tamira Paszek in the final, 6–3, 6–4 to win the girls' singles tennis title at the 2005 Wimbledon Championships.

Seeds

  Victoria Azarenka (semifinals)
  Ágnes Szávay (semifinals)
  Jessica Kirkland (quarterfinals)
 n/a
  Dominika Cibulková (quarterfinals)
  Aleksandra Wozniak (quarterfinals)
  Jarmila Gajdošová (third round)
  Raluca Olaru (second round)
  Chan Yung-jan (third round)
  Caroline Wozniacki (first round)
  Marina Erakovic (third round)
  Ekaterina Makarova (quarterfinals)
  Alexa Glatch (third round)
  Monica Niculescu (second round)
  Vania King (second round)
  Bibiane Schoofs (first round)

Draw

Finals

Top half

Section 1

Section 2

Bottom half

Section 3

Section 4

References

External links

Girls' Singles
Wimbledon Championship by year – Girls' singles